The President of the Senate presided over the Senate of South Africa, the upper house of the Parliament of South Africa. The President was chosen from among the Senators at its first sitting following a general election and whenever the office was vacant. The President acted as a "referee", taking charge of debates to make sure that the Senators could participate freely while keeping to the rules. The President also had managerial duties to ensure that Senate runs smoothly.  Each political party in the Senate elected a chief whip to run its affairs. The presiding officers, the chief whips, and the Leader of Government Business (the person appointed by the Cabinet to liaise with Parliament) together decided on the programme of work.

The President of the Senate had a dormant commission to become acting State President of South Africa when there was a vacancy in that office, which was often the case, especially between 1967 and 1979.

The Senate was abolished for the first time in 1980, with effect from 1 January 1981, during a process of constitutional reform, and replaced with the President's Council. The Senate was briefly reestablished under the 1993 interim constitution. The Senate was abolished for the second and final time under the 1997 constitution. The office of President of the Senate was succeeded by the office of Chairperson of the National Council of Provinces.

List of presidents (1910–1980 and 1994–1997)

See also

Senate of South Africa
National Council of Provinces

References

 Keesing's Contemporary Archives (various volumes)
 The South African Constitution, by H.J. May (3rd edition 1955, Juta & Co)

External links
South African ministries, etc – Rulers.org

Legislative speakers in South Africa
Parliament of South Africa